Margaret Ernestine Burton (1885–1969) was an American missionary who traveled to China and Japan in 1909. She wrote several books based on her experiences and research while there.

Her books include:
(1911) The Education of Women in China
(1912) Notable Women of Modern China
(1914) The Education of Women in Japan
(1918) Women workers of the Orient

References

External links
 
 
 

1885 births
1969 deaths
20th-century American memoirists
American Protestant missionaries
American social sciences writers
Protestant missionaries in China
Protestant missionaries in Japan
Female Christian missionaries
American expatriates in China